Ketut Wiana is a prominent Hindu scholar in Indonesia. He is one of the foremost authorities on Agama Hindu Dharma.

Judgements
He urged Balinese to not sacrifice turtles in puja and to follow Indonesian regulations on protecting the Sea Turtles, citing the Vedas.

References

Year of birth missing (living people)
Living people
Indonesian Hindu religious leaders
Balinese people
Scholars of Hinduism